Raunheim station is a railway station in the town of Raunheim in the German state of Hesse on the Main Railway from Mainz to Frankfurt am Main. It is classified by Deutsche Bahn as a category 5 station. The station is served by the S-Bahn. The station was opened in 1863.

Services
Raunheim lies in the area served by the Rhein-Main-Verkehrsverbund (Rhine-Main Transport Association, RMV). It is used by Rhine-Main S-Bahn trains operated by DB Regio, and buses.

Trains
Services on lines S8 and S9 each operate at 30-minute intervals on the Wiesbaden Hauptbahnhof–Hanau Hauptbahnhof route. Together the two lines operate at 15-minute intervals through Raunheim. Line S8 runs through Mainz Hauptbahnhof to Wiesbaden Hauptbahnhof, while line S9 runs via Kostheim Bridge to Mainz-Kastel and Wiesbaden Hauptbahnhof.

Buses 
The station is also served by bus lines 78 and 79.

Notes

Rhine-Main S-Bahn stations
Railway stations in Hesse
Railway stations in Germany opened in 1863
Buildings and structures in Groß-Gerau (district)